This article contains information about the literary events and publications of 1528.

Events
October 2 – William Tyndale's The Obedience of a Christian Man (The Obedience of a Christen man, and how Christen rulers ought to govern) is printed in Antwerp for clandestine distribution in England.

New books
Baltissare Castiglione – The Book of the Courtier (Il Cortegiano)
Jacques Lefèvre d'Étaples – Ancien Testament (translation of the Old Testament into French)
Francisco Delicado – Portrait of Lozana: The Lusty Andalusian Woman (Retrato de la Loçana andaluza)
Desiderius Erasmus – Ciceronianus
Jean Fernel – Cosmotheoria
Martin Luther – Confession Concerning Christ's Supper (Vom Abendmahl Christi, Bekenntnis)
William Tyndale – The Obedience of a Christian Man

New drama
Ludovico Ariosto
La Lena
Il Negromante (approximate date of first performance)

New poetry

Anna Bijns – Refrains

Births
November 2 – Petrus Lotichius Secundus, born Peter Lotz, German scholar and Latin poet (died 1560)
unknown dates
Rémy Belleau, French poet (died 1577)
Birbal, born Maheshdas Bhat, Indian poet, wit and Grand Vizier of the Mughal court (died 1586)
Jean-Jacques Boissard, French antiquary and Latin poet (died 1602)
Henri Estienne, French printer and classical scholar (died 1598)
António Ferreira, Portuguese poet (died 1569)
Atagi Fuyuyasu (安宅 冬康), Japanese samurai and poet (died 1564)
Phùng Khắc Khoan, Vietnamese military strategist, politician, diplomat and poet (died 1613)
Thomas Whythorne, English composer and autobiographer (died 1595)

Deaths
March 10 – Balthasar Hubmaier, German Anabaptist theologian (born c.1480)
November 17 – Jakob Wimpfeling, humanist and theologian (born 1450)
unknown dates
Al-Birjandi, Persian scientist
Richard Hyrde, English scholar and translator
Erhard Ratdolt, German printer (born 1442)
probable – Giorgio Anselmo, Italian physician and Latin poet (born c.1458)

References

Years of the 16th century in literature